KJJD (1170 AM "La Ley") is a radio station broadcasting a Mexican regional format. Licensed to Windsor, Colorado, United States, it serves the Ft. Collins-Greeley area.  The station is currently owned by Rodriguez-Gallegos Broadcasting Corporation.
The station plays banda, cumbia, norteña, and ranchera music.

External links
La Ley 1170 Facebook

Mexican-American culture in Colorado
JJD
Regional Mexican radio stations in the United States
Radio stations established in 1987
JJD